Magdalen College School (MCS) is a public school (English private day school) in Oxford, England, for boys aged seven to eighteen and for girls in the sixth form. It was founded by William Waynflete about 1480 as part of Magdalen College, Oxford.

In 2010 The Good Schools Guide described the school as having "A comfortable mix of brains, brawn and artistic flair but demanding and challenging too.  Not what you might expect a boys' public school to look like or feel like."

The school was named Independent School of the Year by The Sunday Times in 2004, and 2008, being the first boys' school to attain this accolade twice.

The school is run by a headmaster, known since the foundation of the school simply as "the Master" and controlled by a Board of Governors, who appoint the Master. It has both a senior school and a junior school. The Senior School has six houses, each headed by a housemaster selected from the senior members of the teaching staff, of whom there are about 160. There are also six houses in the Junior School.

Almost all of the school's pupils go on to university, about a third of them to Oxford or Cambridge.

The present Master, Helen Pike, was appointed in August 2016, after previously being Headmistress of the South Hampstead High School and is the first female Master in the school's history.

In a review by the Independent Schools Inspectorate in 2017, the school was described as remarkable and providing rich opportunities, where "pupils' academic results are exceptional".

History

Early history
The School was founded by William Waynflete as a department of Magdalen College, to teach the sixteen boy choristers of the college, who sang in the college's chapel, as well as other local children of high academic achievement. The first certain evidence of the school's existence dates to 1480, although the beginnings of the school are probably at least as early as 1478. Since then, it has grown in size from about thirty boys to over 850 children.

Over its history, the school occupied various parts of the present-day Magdalen College, firstly the low hall south of the Chapel of the Hospital of St. John the Baptist, which before the establishment of Magdalen College by William Waynflete had occupied the present site. This building, replaced by the 15th-century college buildings, stood roughly between the present-day porters' lodge and the Great Tower.

Grant-aided status

After the First World War, the school opted into the arrangements of the Education (Administrative Provisions) Act 1907, and as a grant-aided secondary school had to guarantee a quarter of its places as free scholarships for boys from public elementary schools. Of this decision, Stanier, a former Master and the author of the school history, writes:

The origins of the present-day school site begin in the late 19th century, when the school was occupying part of the college grounds alongside Longwall Street. It was slowly relocated by a few hundred feet, over Magdalen Bridge, onto the present site on Cowley Place began under the tenure of W. E. Sherwood in 1891 when, after an outbreak of scarlet fever in the old boarding house on the corner of Longwall Street and the High Street (ascribed partly to the dilapidated state of the building and in particular to the drainage) plans for a new school house were laid out. The new building on the Plain, which forms the modern-day School House, was first used in September 1894 when boarders at the school moved into it.

At that time, teaching still took place on the Longwall Street site. Boarders thus had a short daily walk over Magdalen Bridge to the college. The choristers still today make this short daily journey, but using a tunnel under Magdalen Bridge to avoid crossing the busy road.

The school continued to grow during the early 20th century, and by 1925, there were about 170 students.

Migration to Cowley Place
In 1928, increased pressure on the Magdalen College buildings on Longwall Street caused the migration of the entire school over Magdalen Bridge. Plans were made for new buildings designed by Giles Gilbert Scott, but this period was marked by uncertainty for the school, as in 1926 the College statute referring to the School had been altered. "Where before it had ordained that the College should always maintain the School, it now ran, 'So long as the grammar school of the College in Oxford is maintained....". As a result, temporary classrooms were built along Cowley Place, most of which are still standing today.

The buildings that the school had used on Longwall Street underwent a change of use or were redeveloped, and now form part of the College buildings: the School's original 'Big School' became the present-day "New Library" of the college, and the former school playground turned into the college's Longwall Quad.

A new school chapel was added to the 1928 buildings at the Milham Ford end, paid for by Old Boys, and was furnished with stained glass from the original chapel on Longwall Street, portraits of former Masters, Ushers, and Old Waynfletes (men educated at the school), and with an old organ built by Binns of Bramley, near Leeds. Choir stalls later donated by the Old Waynfletes and carved by Stanley Fisher completed the building, until it was eventually transformed into a Library when the present-day Big School building was opened in 1966. The stalls from the chapel of 1929 are now in the 'altar' section of the new Big School.

Second World War and "Bricks for wood"
By 1938, the school's buildings had become too small. They had always been of a timber construction, never designed for longevity. This was the topic of the 1938 Commemoration speech given by Dr John Johnson, in which a "Bricks for wood" appeal was made to nineteen other donors, to be matched by Dr Johnson in raising a total of £20,000 to rejuvenate the fabric of the school. Whilst £8,000 was promised by the end of the year, the outbreak of the Second World War curtailed any further fundraising or large-scale building for its duration.

Under the mastership of Kennard Davis, the period of the war was marked by an increase in the school's numbers, caused in part by the relative safety of the city of Oxford, while the Officers' Training Corps, precursor to the present-day Combined Cadet Force, "played its part in the defence of Oxford against possible enemy parachutists and fifth-columnists, guarding the river banks at night with fixed bayonets!". By 1949, the school had about 400 pupils. At the end of the war, the Education Act 1944 saw the school opt to become a Direct grant grammar school, continuing its long-standing tradition of open education.

After the War, the school took over buildings on the site of the present-day Hard Courts and Music Department, built for civil defence, including several air raid shelters and huts, as well as buildings formerly belonging to the defunct Milham Ford School, and these formed part of an expanded school which by now had several hundred pupils. A building campaign in the 1950s represented the first wave of a gradual expansion and enlargement of the school, commencing in 1951 with a five-building concrete block, and more significantly, between 1955 and 1957, the construction of the three-storey teaching block which is near the modern Colin Sanders building.

In the late 1950s, the school faced another threat: a new road was proposed, to ease traffic flow, which would have straddled both the school fields and the site of the boarding house. This plan was never set into motion, and in 1957 the school built new laboratories, on the Plain roundabout end of the site, now housing both science and Design & Technology facilities. In 1959, a movement began towards constructing the present-day Big School building, which was designed by Booth, Ledeboer, and Pinckheard and eventually opened in 1966. The new building was hexagonal, with a stage and orchestra pit at one end and an altar (given by Magdalen College) in a chapel area at the other, as well as an acoustic-panelled ceiling and a cluster of lighting.

With the opening of the new Big School, the old Big School became the school's gymnasium. With the stage removed, the floor replaced, a wall removed to connect the hall with the adjoining classroom, and with the addition of wallbars and gym apparatus, this 'temporary' building began a new phase in its long history.

Independence
By the late 1960s, the school's status as a Direct Grant scheme member came under threat as sweeping changes were made to the then Tripartite System. By 1976, the school was no longer a Direct Grant school, the Governors having opted to become fully independent.

The 1970s also saw two further buildings: new Science buildings on the Cowley Road side, and a new music facility including a large rehearsal room suitable for a chamber ensemble or small orchestra, several smaller tuition rooms, a classroom, and sheet music and instrument stores.

The school's quincentenary in 1980 saw the further addition of buildings on the Cowley Road side, including modern physics and chemistry laboratories.

1998 saw the opening of the new Colin Sanders building, named after an Old Waynflete who was heavily involved in fundraising for the building but died before its completion. It originally housed two common rooms on the ground floor, which later became computing suites, with the 1928 'Big School' undergoing another change of use to house a merged sixth-form centre next to the Staff Common Room, into which it subsequently expanded upon the completion of the New Building complex at the bottom of Cowley Place, which also houses a new Dining Hall.

With the demolition of the 1929 library, the ground floor open areas of the Colin Sanders building now house the Basil Blackwell library.

On 20 March 2007, Dr David Brunton, head of media studies and English teacher at the school, was found dead at the base of St Mary the Virgin Church tower in Radcliffe Square, Oxford. His death was recorded as accidental. A bursary was set up by pupils, parents and staff in his memory.

In 2010, the school admitted girls in the sixth form for the first time, and continues to offer coeducation in the final two years (Years 12 and 13).

Junior School
The Junior School is the section of MCS for boys of ages seven to eleven (or years 3 to 6). Year 3 is split into J1A and J1B and contains around 28 boys; Year 4 is split into 2 J2A and J2B and contains approximately the same number; Year 5 is split into J3A and J3B and contains around 35 boys; while Year 6 is split into J4A and J4B and contains around 40 boys. The current head of the Junior School is Mr Timothy Skipwith, while the deputy head is Mrs Elizabeth Stapleton. There is an art competition every year; it is to design a front/back cover for the Magdalen College Junior School magazine called Views from the Bridge.
There are six houses: Holt; Millard, More, Ogle, Tyndale and Wolsey, named after old masters of the school who have achieved notable things.

Terms
The school operates a three-term academic year and refers to its terms by the names of the University of Oxford's three terms, which however are shorter than the school's. They are:
 The Michaelmas term, from early September to mid December
 The Hilary term, from mid-January to late March
 The Trinity term, from late April to late June or early July

Pupils' houses

House names 
There are six houses at Magdalen, named after former prefects who died in the two World Wars. Each house is associated with a colour. They are:

Sport

School Field, an island in the River Cherwell originally leased from Christ Church in 1893, and connected by 'willow-pattern' bridges to the School House rose gardens, provides space for field sports such as cricket, rugby and football, as well as lawn tennis. The field was levelled for sports in 1907, and the present pavilion was originally constructed in 1913.

Kingball
Kingball is a game played at Magdalen. The tradition, unique to the school, may have derived from Fives, for which a court was in use at the school at least as early as 1871, but the rules are more similar to the modern games of four square and Dirty Nine Square. Although to some extent the rules are passed down from year to year, every new year that takes up the game usually adopts its own rules as well; the rules listed below are those commonly in use around 2008. The game has been actively played during breaktimes amongst pupils using four courts, painted by the school. The game is still played every day at the school.

Game layout
The game is played on a court that is very distinctly shaped. The ball (a tennis ball) is bounced around the court and the players progress up the shaped squares (although in fact only two of them are rectangular) until he is in the 'King' square. Then he serves, and so the game progresses until he is eventually knocked off the 'King' square. The game is predominantly played by younger boys, ranging from 8–13 years old. However, whenever boys from this age range vacate the courts and there are no tutors to tell them otherwise, older pupils enjoy playing the unique "sport". The seven squares are, in order of descending rank: King, Queen, Jack, Big, Triangle (known to some as 'Pizza'), Evil, and Rabies. If the court has been filled up then the extra players join another player currently playing to form a team of two, or a "double".

Rules
When the ball bounces in a player's square, they must palm, kick, or otherwise hit it into another square.
If a player touches the ball more than once in a row, they are 'out' unless it has touched the wall of a surrounding classroom building in between the touches of the ball.
The ball may bounce an unlimited number of times inside a square, but if it switches to merely rolling or if it comes to rest, (including by another player stamping on it with one foot while keeping the other in their own square), they are 'out'.
The ball may bounce up to three times outside of a square, but on the fourth the player who occupies the last square the ball bounced in (or the player to hit it out if it is hit directly out of the court) is 'out'.
If the ball rolls out of the court, the occupant of the square it rolled out of is 'out'.
A player may hit the ball against the wall of surrounding classroom buildings that face the playground, and in doing so will 'reset' the 'count' of bounces, and may now hit the ball again to direct it into the court.
A player may stamp the ball and stop it moving in the court, thus rendering the occupant of the stamped square "out".

One can play with one player per square (7), Or can double up (14); triples (21) and quadruples (28) versions are played as more people join. When the game was played in the late 1970s and early 1980s the only lawful play was that identified at (1) above. If a player could not lawfully play the ball after the first bounce in his square (and at that time the squares were indeed square-shaped and measured about 1.5 to 2 metres from corner to corner) then he was demoted. Also at this time, the names of the squares were not fixed – save for the King square – although frequent references to Queen, Jack, 10 and so on (as per a suit in a pack of cards) were made informally. There was no fixed number of squares although the normal number was 6 (in a 3x2 formation); 8 was not infrequent and larger numbers could be chosen to avoid long queues of 'slaves', who would wait to enter 'Rabies' after being demoted before players began to double-up in squares.

The service is played by bouncing the ball into one's own square so as to bounce in another's square and the original serve is above waist height. The occupant of that square then plays as above. If the ball bounces in one of the 'royalty' squares (Jack, Queen, King) or touches the occupant of one of these squares before bouncing in another square or touching its occupants after a serve, the serve is called 'foul'. The same applies if the ball bounces outside the court without immediately without bouncing in another player's square. The King may reserve once, but if he serves 'foul' a second time, he is 'out'.

As different year groups follow different rules, those described above may not hold true for all games, but will form the basic structure of any games that take place. Key differences include the use alternative names for some of the seven squares (to be used alongside other squares keeping the names as indicated above), such as: Prince, Easy, and Tiny. Some variations on rules also include that the serve be passed to Queen should King serve 'foul' on the first attempt.

Societies and pastimes

Societies 
Magdalen has a longstanding culture of clubs and societies, frequently run and operated by boys, and some of which (such as the Climbing and Sailing clubs) charge a small annual membership fee (which is used fund club equipment and activities and in some cases improve communal school resources). Such clubs include well-established, traditional clubs like those in other schools such as the Debating Society, Chess Club, Historical Society, Model United Nations, and various musical societies including a Symphony and Concert Orchestra, the Choral Society and various jazz and chamber groups. More esoteric clubs and societies include the well-established St. Thomas More Society for Catholics, a bell-ringing club, a large Computer Science scheme, and multiple clubs for different types of Role-playing games.

During lunchbreak and morning breaks, pupils frequently play in the central playground or Milham Ford, behind the main teaching block (formerly grass and now occupied by hockey / tennis courts). 'The Spit' (one of the school fields) is used during breaktimes by the Junior School, and has a fenced grass area and a Playground with swings and slides, etc. Informal activities during breaktimes include football and cricket etc., as well as Magdalen's traditional game, Kingball.

CCF and CSO
At the end of the L4th, pupils are allowed to take part in Combined Cadet Force (CCF), although this is optional until the end of the 5th form when pupils may choose between CCF or the Community Service Organisation (CSO). They are required to take part for the following year (Lower Sixth) on a Tuesday after school. Many continue with CCF in the Upper Sixth as well, but CSO only ever exists in Lower Sixth (until the end of the academic year 2011-2012 it was compulsory to do one or the other in the Upper Sixth also).

The CCF Contingent is divided up into the Army and Royal Air Force sections. Naval and Signals sections were retired in the early 21st Century, whilst the school Cadet Corps also had at one time REME and Marine sections.

Twice a year there is a CCF field-day, where pupils spend 24 hours (including a night) involved with their particular activity. The Army section usually sleep out overnight in an army training area, carrying out marches, taking part in tactical missions, or meeting different Army Regiments and learning about their specialisations and roles. The RAF section experience flying with No. 6 Air Experience Flight at RAF Benson as well as visiting active air bases and learning about the history of the RAF. During the summer, week-long Adventurous Training and Military camps are held often seeing cadets travel around the world, subsidised by the Ministry of Defence.

CSO provides the chance for pupils to give something back to the community through volunteering. There are a variety of options including work at local primary schools, helping in a charity shop, aiding at the John Radcliffe Hospital and other medical centres, and helping out in hospices or centres for autistic children. One particular favourite is the Concert Party, which consists of two musical ensembles which visit local schools and nursing homes.

School media
The school has an annual magazine, a student newspaper and a satirical publication. The Lily is the official school magazine and yearbook, published yearly, detailing the activities and progress of the school and staff. It is run by a senior pupil Editor and a member of staff with the assistance of an editing team.

The Lily traces its lineage to the Magdalen College School Journal, founded in 1870, and has been continuously published ever since. The magazine was renamed The Lily initially in 1880, and finally (after masquerading as The Magdalen Magazine for a year in 1887) adopted the present title in 1888.

The school also has a newspaper called The Melting Pot. It runs many articles on a wide variety of subjects, both related and unrelated to the school. It is published every half-term and is run by an Editor in Chief, with subsequent subject area editors. The MCS Inquirer was also published as a satirical insert in The Melting Pot for two years between 2009 and 2011, recently reintroduced in 2014. There is also a newsletter named 'The Magdalen Blazer' in the Junior School.

Music and drama

Music 
The current Director of Music is Jon Cullen, and the Assistant Director of Music is Sabrina Shortland. The school boasts two organs (one electric action in 'Big School', one digital in the Music School) and a building for music (performance spaces include the School Hall (called 'Big School'), the Music School and the new dining hall). Many instruments are taught, and many ensembles catering to a wide variety of tastes and styles operate on a weekly basis. The school participates in many national competitions; many pupils are part of the National Youth Orchestra and National Youth Choirs of Great Britain, and the school gives scholarships for dedicated and talented musicians.

The school also serves as the school for the Choristers of Magdalen College, Oxford. There are sixteen choristers at any one time, in a tradition that has been unbroken since 1458, who sing daily services in the college chapel and perform in other concerts and events throughout the year.

Drama
Many plays are put on every year at Magdalen in both Big School and other venues, including the Oxford Playhouse, the Burton Taylor Studio and the Sheldonian Theatre. There is an annual house drama competition in which each house produces a small 10-minute segment of drama, often written by its own members. The School Musical is held in the Michaelmas Term, and other productions are put on throughout the year. Most recently, the school has put on Grease, Anything Goes, David Mamet's Glengarry Glen Ross, Sophocles' Oedipus Rex, Coram Boy, Kiss me Kate, Joseph and the Amazing Technicolor Dreamcoat, Euripides' Medea, A Funny Thing Happened on the Way to the Forum, 42nd Street and Cabaret. In previous years girls from surrounding schools, such as Oxford High School and Headington School, came in to play female roles, although this has ceased since the school was opened to Sixth Form girls.

The school's 2010 Arts Festival featured performances of  Kenneth Grahame'''s The Wind in the Willows and a chorister drama called The Gentleman Usher, by George Chapman as well as other student-written productions. The Arts Festival is now an annual feature in the school calendar at the end of the Trinity Term.

The school has recently announced a partnership with the Oxford Playhouse, involving a Drama Academy and two new appointments, and allowing the school three shows a year in the Burton Taylor Studios and one on the Playhouse's main stage. Students from the school also frequently take a performance on tour to the Edinburgh Festival Fringe, the most recent of which being an adaptation of Shakespeare's "King John".

School Songs
The school has had many famous musicians over time. There are many songs dedicated to the school by such past pupils with the school hymn being one of them, entitled 'Miles Christi' ('Christ's Soldier'), sung at Prizegiving and, more recently, at the first Chapel service of the school year. The other school hymn is "The Lilies of the Field", set to music by Dr H. C. Stewart OW, which is sung at the Remembrance service every November, and at the Commemoration service at the end of the school year.

The 'House Singing' competition has recently become an annual school event, in which the various houses of the school compete against each other in the form of singing. A guest judge attends each year to cast the verdict on the results of the tournament.

Celebrations
Magdalen's best-known celebration, Commemoration, takes place on the last Saturday of full term in the Trinity Term. Instituted by C. E. Brownrigg and first held on 23 June 1906, this has been a regular fixture in the school calendar ever since. This day is begun with a service the University Church of St Mary's, with full recitation of the dozens of names of the benefactors of the school, followed by tea, music, and a cricket match on School Field in the afternoon.

Other schools of that name
Wayneflete's original foundation also included a Magdalen College School at Wainfleet, Lincolnshire, which closed in 1933.

There is still a Magdalen College School at Brackley, Northamptonshire.

Notable Masters
Cardinal Wolsey – Henry VIII's closest adviser
John Sherry  – Master, 1534-1540 (succeeded by ----- Goodall)
Charles Edward Brownrigg – Master, 1900–1930; previously Usher 1888–1900, Chairman and Host to HMC in 1907.
Robert Spenser Stanier - Master, 1944-1967; author
Timothy Hands - Master, 2008–2016
Helen Pike - Master, 2016–present; author

Notable staff
Colin Hannaford - former mathematics teacher, author and educational reformist

Notable alumni

Former pupils are called Old Waynfletes (OWs) after the founder.

Roughly in chronological order:
St Thomas More  – Roman Catholic martyr 
William Tyndale – translator of the Bible into English
John Foxe – Protestant martyrologist
Sir Basil Blackwell – bookseller; the Library was named in his honour
Edgeworth David (Sir Tannatt William Edgeworth David FRS) – geologist, discoverer of major Australian coalfield, Antarctic explorer
Frank Arthur Bellamy - astronomer and philatelist
 Sir Richard Olaf Winstedt, authority on Malayan history
Noel Chavasse VC & Bar – the most highly decorated soldier in British history.
Sir Henry John Stedman Cotton, KCSI, Chief Commissioner of Assam; Cotton College, Guwahati is named after him
Sir George Bonner - King's Remembrancer, legal scholar and Senior Master of the High Court of Justice
Ivor Novello – singer/songwriter and actor
Sir Ivo Rigby, Chief Justice of Hong Kong
Stewart Pether - cricketer
John Caird – director of Les MisérablesChristopher Peacocke – philosopher
Nigel Starmer-Smith – BBC rugby correspondent
Jim Rosenthal – TV sports commentator
Adam Lively – contemporary novelist
Martin Jones – concert pianist
Will Wyatt - television executive
Tim Hunt – Nobel Prize recipient and scientist
Rick Fenn – rock guitarist, member of 10cc
Wayne Masterson – scientist
Guy Browning – humorous writer and business guru
Giles Borg – film director
Charles Lonsdale – British Ambassador to Armenia
Sam Mendes – Oscar-winning film and stage director, best known for directing the Bond film Skyfall.
Misha Glenny – BBC Eastern Europe correspondent
Rob Leslie-Carter – engineer
Ben Goldacre – journalist
Daniel Sandford – BBC News Home Affairs Correspondent
Kenneth G. Wilson – Nobel Prize winner and scientist
John Kasmin – Art dealer who promoted David Hockney
Alexander Aris – elder son of Nobel Prize-winning democracy and human rights campaigner Aung San Suu Kyi and Michael Aris
Julian Opie – modern artist
Jeremy R. Knowles – Professor of Chemistry and Biochemistry at Harvard University
Jonathan Bailey – actor
Yannis Philippakis – frontman of the band Foals
Robert Steadman – drummer for the band Stornoway
Oliver Steadman – bassist for the band Stornoway
Jon Briggs – television and radio presenter
Lawrence Booth (cricket writer) - editor of Wisden Cricketers' Almanack
Tom Scriven – Cricketer
Omid Scobie – journalist and writer
Martin Reynolds – Principal Private Secretary to the Prime Minister
Roland Fleming – scientist

Bibliography
Several books have been written about the school, including:
2019: Bebbington, David. Goodbye Shirley: The Wartime Letters of an Oxford Schoolboy 1939-1947. [Grosvenor House Publishing]. 
2016: Brockliss, Lawrence. Magdalen College School. [Shire Publications].
2014: Bebbington, David. Mister Brownrigg's Boys: Magdalen College School and The Great War. London: [Pen and Sword Books]. .
1988: Orme, Nicholas Education in Early Tudor England: Magdalen College Oxford and its School, 1480–1540 [Magdalen College].
1980: Clarke, D. L. L. Magdalen School: Five Hundred Years on [Blackwell].
1977: Hey, Colin Magdalen Schooldays 1917–1924 [Senecio].
1940: Stanier, R. S. Magdalen School [first edition, Clarendon Press, 1940; second edition Blackwell, 1958].

Two novels are acknowledged to be set in the school:
The novel North by long-serving former Head of English Brian Martin (Macmillan New Writing, 2006) is widely acknowledged to be set in the school, although it is not mentioned by name. Many of the school's teaching staff who served in the early-to-mid-2000s are only thinly disguised when they crop up as central characters in the novel, although despite rumours to the contrary the titular pupil "North" appears to be a fictional compound of several old boys (part of plot concerns his love affair with a teacher).
Another novel which is clearly based on a fictional version of the school is The Singing Time'' by Maida Stanier, wife of a former Master (Michael Joseph, 1975).

References

External links
 
 Profile at the Good Schools Guide
 ISI inspection report
 A history of the choristers of Magdalen College School, Oxford

1480 establishments in England
Choir schools in England
Educational institutions established in the 15th century
Boys' schools in Oxfordshire
Private schools in Oxfordshire
Schools in Oxford
School
Member schools of the Headmasters' and Headmistresses' Conference
Church of England private schools in the Diocese of Oxford
Arthur Blomfield buildings
University-affiliated secondary schools